Matthias Worch is a German-born heavy metal singer better known by his stage name Mandy Lion. He is the lead singer of the heavy metal band World War III.

Biography
He moved to Los Angeles, California, in 1986 and formed World War III. He caught the attention of manager Don Arden, who signed a contract with him. Soon after, Lion was signed to Hollywood Records. With the help of Arden he began auditioning celebrity players to create the line-up of the new World War III. The chosen line-up was Jimmy Bain, Vinny Appice, and Joe Floyd, who had played with Warrior; at the time, Floyd had other obligations and Tracy G was chosen to fill Floyd's spot. In 1990, World War III released their debut self-titled album on the Hollywood Records label, and soon thereafter began extensive touring.

Vinny Appice was replaced with James Kottak, who would in turn be replaced by Mikkey Dee. Things changed when Steve Jones, the A&R Director for WWIII, tried to depict an image on the band as Nazis, which caused Lion to rebel against the label. Heavy friction and disagreements between band members began when he started a side project with George Lynch on Elektra Records. These problems weighed heavily on Lion and eventually caused him to step back and put WWIII on hold.

Wicked Alliance (1994–2003)
In 1994 Lion began a new project and set out on the road to tour with Jake E. Lee as Wicked Alliance. Wicked Alliance's Twisted Beauty CD that Lee and Lion worked on, finally came to the light in late 2002 or early 2003 on the Pony Canyon record label.

World War Three (2003–present)
Besides working on his solo project, Lion had reformed his previous band, WWIII. WWIII signed with Sony Records and Reality Entertainment, and on October 30, 2003, released their first album in 12 years, When God Turned Away. The band hosted a release party for the album at Club Vodka.

On April 18, 2004, Vinny Appice and Jimmy Bain had a jam session with Lion during WWIII's concert at the Key Club in West Hollywood, California. The session was video taped and some of the scenes were placed in the music video for "Walk With Me". In the summer of 2004, original members, Vinny Appice and Jimmy Bain rejoined the band. WWIII performed at the Metal Sludge concert number nine in Tarzana, California on September 18, 2004. The newly reformed WWIII with Appice, Bain, Lion, and Scaria, performed in Bakersfield, California on October 30, 2004.

On April 19, 2008, the original line-up of WWIII reunited.

Mandy Lion is currently writing with George Lynch (Dokken, Lynchmob) on a full-length album. The current line-up consists of Dan McNay (Montrose), Lez Warner (The Cult) and Toni Aleman. Guest appearances include Sin Quirin (Ministry), Mitch Perry (Edgar Winter, Cher), Roy Z (Halford, Judas Priest, Iron Maiden) and others.

Solo work
In the spring of 2006, Lion headlined the Nikstock Festivals in Los Angeles, California and Binghamton, New York.

In May 2007, Lion announced a 16-day U.S. tour, with stops in Syracuse, New York, Binghamton, New York, Stamford, Connecticut, West Springfield, Virginia, Allentown, Pennsylvania, Nichols, New York, and Las Vegas. On June 1, Lion announced the line-up for his touring band. It was himself, Rick Plester, Jon Purpura, and Pete Holmes.

Discography

Solo
 Mandy Lion (2002)

World War Three (WWIII)
 World War III (1990)
 The Unreleased Demos (2000)
 When God Turned Away (2003)

Wicked Alliance
 Twisted Beauty (2002)

Guest appearances
 George Lynch: Sacred Groove (1993)

Singles

World War Three (WWIII)
 "Love You To Death" (1990)
 "Time For Terror" (1990)

Solo
 "Kiss" (2008)

References

External links
 Official YouTube Channel
 
 
 

German rock musicians
German heavy metal singers
German male singers
Year of birth missing (living people)
Living people